The yacht Carinthia VII was built in the Lürssen Yachts yard in 2002 and refurbished in the same yard three years later. One of the largest motor yachts in the world, it is owned by Heidi Horten, widow of the German entrepreneur Helmut Horten.

Description 
The twin screws are driven by four MTU 1163 diesel main engines, generating 39,700 bhp in total, enabling Carinthia VII to reach a maximum speed of 26 knots.

History 
Carinthia VII was commissioned from the Bremen shipyard Lürssen Yachts and designer Tim Heywood under the name "Project Fabergé" by the Austrian billionaire Heidi Horten. 
It initially sailed under the flag of Austria and with a home port of Venice, Italy. In 2013 the registry was changed to Malta.

In April 2022, the yacht was put up for sale by Frasers for €120M (approx USD$129,463,000, VAT Paid)

References 

2000 ships
Motor yachts